Chodakowski is a surname. Notable people with the surname include:

 Zorian Dołęga-Chodakowski (1784–1825), Polish ethnographer and archaeologist
 Romanas Chodakauskas (1883–1932), Lithuanian military attaché to Berlin and Colonel in the Lithuanian Military Court
Sofija Smetonienė (née Chodakauskaitė) (1885–1968), the wife of the first President of Lithuania Antanas Smetona and  First Lady of Lithuania
Tadas Chodakauskas (1889–1959), the long-standing mayor of Panevėžys, Lithuania (1925–1940).
Jadvyga Tūbelienė (née Chodakauskaitė) (1891–1988), one of the founders of the Lithuanian Women's Council, a writer, journalist, head of the Information Bureau in Bern and Paris, Deputy Chief of Mission to Switzerland and married to Juozas Tūbelis, the longest-standing Prime Minister of Lithuania
Kazimierz Chodakowski (1929–2017), Polish ice hockey defenceman and Olympian
 Miron Chodakowski (1957–2010), Polish religious figure

Also see the Chodakowski Family.
Polish-language surnames